KLY or kly may refer to:
 kly, kilolight-year
 Kly (Mělník District), Central Bohemian Region, Czech Republic
 ISO 639-3 code of Kalao language from Indonesia
 Kalaw Lagaw Ya, an indigenous Australian language
 Kenley railway station, London